Sulejman Haxhi Mema (born 17 November 1955) is a former player and manager of Tirana Youth. He has also been head of refereeing at the Football Association of Albania.

International career
He made his debut for Albania in an April 1983 European Championship qualification match against Northern Ireland, coming on as a second-half substitute for Shkëlqim Muça. It turned out to be his sole international match.

Personal life
Sulejman was born into a football family, as he is the son of Ali Mema, another former player and manager of Tirana, who in 2006 was honoured with the "Legend of Albanian Football" award by FAA. He is also the nephew of Osman Mema, Ali's brother, and cousin of Ardian Mema.

Mema is the principal of the Sports mastery school Loro Boriçi in Tirana.

Honours

Player
Albanian Superliga: 2
 1982, 1985

Manager
Tirana
Albanian Superliga: 1998–99, 2003–04
Albanian Supercup: 2003, 2007

References

External links

1955 births
Living people
Footballers from Tirana
Albanian footballers
Association football midfielders
Albania international footballers
KF Tirana players
Kategoria Superiore players
Albanian football managers
KF Tirana managers
FK Partizani Tirana managers
Kategoria Superiore managers